Sébastien Impeto Pengo is a former acting governor of Équateur, which until 2015 was one of the ten provinces of the Democratic Republic of the Congo.
Former governor Louis Alphonse Koyagialo was physically unable to perform his function, after which Sébastien Impeto Pengo was appointed as an acting governor by Joseph Kabila, the president of the Democratic Republic of the Congo.

References

Year of birth missing (living people)
Living people
Democratic Republic of the Congo Protestants
People's Party for Reconstruction and Democracy politicians
Governors of provinces of the Democratic Republic of the Congo